Books by Astrid Lindgren featuring the Six Bullerby Children (in the US released as The Children of Noisy Village):

 All About the Bullerby Children
 Cherry Time at Bullerby
 Six Bullerby Children
 Springtime at Bullerby

It was originally published in 1947 in Sweden. It has since been translated into 39 languages and published in many countries including the United States and the United Kingdom.

These books are about six children living in a tiny, remote village in Sweden and are set in the late 1930s, a relatively calm time in Sweden, although a war "starting soon" is sometimes briefly mentioned in newspapers the children are reading. The agricultural world is still in a pre-industrial state (no tractors or harvesters) but there are cars in the village and shops are accessible.

The narrator is a young girl named Lisa; she tells us about her life and adventures in the small and neat Swedish village Bullerby (Bullerbyn in Swedish). The village consists of three lined up houses in which live seven children with their parents and housekeepers: Lisa with her older brothers Lasse and Bosse, the siblings Britta and Anna, as well as Olle with his younger sister Kerstin. 

Bullerbyn is identical with a small village called Sevedstorp where Lindgren's father grew up (10 miles from her hometown Vimmerby and the village Näs—the birthplace of Astrid Lindgren). Even today the three houses which appear in the story remain in Sevedstorp, where Astrid Lindgren's grandparents lived.

Films
1960 – Alla vi barn i Bullerbyn (television), directed by Olle Hellbom
1986 – The Children of Noisy Village, directed by Lasse Hallström
1987 – More About the Children of Noisy Village, directed by Lasse Hallström

The television series from 1960 was also re-edited into two feature films, Alla vi barn i Bullerbyn (1960) and Bara roligt i Bullerbyn (1961). The two movies by Lasse Hallström were reworked into a 7 episode TV-series, titled Alla vi barn i Bullerbyn, that was broadcast in 1989. Some scenes in the film adaptations were shot in the small hamlet Stensjö by in Småland.

References

Swedish children's novels
Series of children's books
Works by Astrid Lindgren
Child characters in literature
Literary characters introduced in 1947
Fictional Swedish people
Fictional sextets
Novels set in the 1930s
Novels set in Sweden
Book series introduced in 1947